The 1969 European Karate Championships, the 4th edition, was held in the sports complex of Crystal Palace in London, England, from 2 to 4 May 1969.

Medalists

Medal table

References

1969
International sports competitions in London
European Karate Championships
European championships in 1969
European Karate Championships
European Karate Championships
Karate competitions in the United Kingdom